The Workshop School is a project based school in the city of Philadelphia and one of the ten Citywide Admission school of The School District of Philadelphia

References

School District of Philadelphia